Mountain rescue services in England and Wales operate under the association of Mountain Rescue England and Wales (MREW), formerly called Mountain Rescue Council of England & Wales. The association has a number of regional mountain rescue teams, each of which is an independent charity. The team members are highly trained volunteers who are called out by the police.

MREW is a member of the International Commission for Mountain Rescue ( / IKAR-CISA).

Overview

Voluntary mountain rescue teams in England and Wales are independent charities whose members are highly trained volunteers who are called out by the police. The police are legally responsible for land based search and rescue but generally lack the resources to discharge this function effectively. Individual teams are normally known as an MRT (mountain rescue team) but some use the term SRT (search and rescue team) or MS&RT (mountain search and rescue team).

Individual teams are members both of the MREW and of their regional association (which is also represented at MREW). Neither MREW nor the regional associations have authority over the individual teams but provide an opportunity to discuss and agree standards, training and equipment. MREW does provide some equipment funding for MRTs both from its own funds and via a small government grant, but teams have to finance their own running costs through charity fund-raising or sponsorship. MRTs in England and Wales receive no direct government funding. The government provides access by teams to Ordnance Survey mapping.

The Royal Air Force Mountain Rescue Service has three teams – one in Scotland, one in England and one in Wales – and as part of the military is wholly government funded. They have primary responsibility for aircraft crashes on high ground, but also respond to civilian calls for assistance from hikers and climbers.

Although the primary focus of mountain rescue is to locate and evacuate injured and/or lost persons in upland environments, teams also undertake a wide range of roles which may differ from team to team:

 missing person searches in lowland areas where access or terrain is difficult;
 support to NHS ambulance services for difficult casualty evacuation;
 support to government agencies/emergency services in flood and heavy snowfall;
 support to government agencies/emergency services at major incidents;
 swift water rescue;
 animal rescue.

Urban search and rescue is currently undertaken by the fire and rescue services as part of their statutory enablement, but at least one mountain rescue team has chosen to train in this field.

Each team has its own primary area of responsibility but frequently deploy outside these areas in support of other teams.

Cave rescue has its own umbrella organisation, the British Cave Rescue Council, but some teams operate as both cave rescue teams and mountain rescue teams.

There are also regional organisations dedicated to the training of search dogs and their handlers. England has two associations, Mountain Rescue Search Dogs England (MRSDE) and the Lake District Mountain Rescue Search Dog Association (LDMRSD). Wales also has two associations the Search and Rescue Dog Association Wales (SARDA Wales) responding to incidents in North Wales and the Search and Rescue Dog Association South Wales (SARDA South Wales). Handlers must be full team members of a mountain rescue team and, once graded, will operate alongside that team, but can also be deployed in support of other teams.

Organisation
The association has 49 regional mountain rescue teams, each of which is an independent charity:

Wales

South
The co-ordinating body for South Wales is covered by the South Wales Search and Rescue Association:
 Brecon MRT
 Central Beacons MRT
 Longtown MRT
 South & Mid Wales Cave Rescue Team (SMWCRT)
 Western Beacons Mountain SART
 SARDA South Wales (Mountain Rescue Search Dogs)

North
The co-ordinating body for North Wales is the North Wales Mountain Rescue Association:
 Aberglaslyn MRT (Porthmadog)
 Aberdyfi Search and Rescue Team 
 HM Coastguard MRT 83 (Holyhead)
 Llanberis MRT
 North East Wales Search & Rescue (NEWSAR)
 North Wales Cave Rescue Organisation (NWCRO)
 Ogwen Valley Mountain Rescue Organisation
 South Snowdonia Search & Rescue
 SARDA Wales (Mountain Rescue Search Dogs)
 Royal Air Force Mountain Rescue Service

England

Lake District

The co-ordinating body for Mountain & Mine Search and Rescue Teams in the Lake District is the
 Lake District Search & Mountain Rescue Association:
 Cockermouth MRT
 Coniston MRT
 COMRU (Cumbria Ore Mines Rescue Unit)
 Duddon and Furness Mountain Rescue Team
 Kendal MRT
 Keswick MRT
 Kirkby Stephen MRT
 Langdale/Ambleside MRT
 Patterdale MRT
 Penrith MRT
 Lake District Mountain Rescue Search Dogs
 Wasdale MRT
 Royal Air Force Mountain Rescue Service

Pennines
The co-ordinating body for Search & Rescue in caves, moors and hills in West Yorkshire, Lancashire, Greater Manchester and the Pennines is the Mid Pennine Search & Rescue Organisation:
 Mid Pennine Search & Rescue Organisation
 Bolton MRT
 Bowland Pennine MRT
 Calder Valley SRT 
 Cave Rescue Organisation (CRO)
 Holme Valley MRT
 Rossendale and Pendle MRT
 SARDA England (Mountain Rescue Search Dogs)

North East
The co-ordinating body for North East is the North East Search & Rescue Association:
 Cleveland MRT
 North of Tyne MRT
 Northumberland National Park MRT
 Swaledale Mountain Rescue Team (Catterick Garrison, North Yorkshire)
 Teesdale & Weardale SMRT
 SARDA England (Mountain Rescue Search Dogs)

Peak District

The co-ordinating body for the Peak District is the Peak District Mountain Rescue Organisation which was formed in 1964:
 Buxton MRT
 Derby MRT
 Derbyshire Cave Rescue Organisation (DCRO)
 Edale MRT
 Glossop MRT
 Oldham MRT
 Woodhead MRT
 SARDA England (Search And Rescue Dog Association)

West Country and the South West
The West Country of England is covered by the South West England Rescue Association:
 Gloucestershire Cave Rescue Group
 Mendip Cave Rescue Organisation
 Severn Area Rescue Association
The South West of England is covered by the "Peninsula Mountain and Cave Rescue Association":
 Dartmoor Search and Rescue Team Ashburton
 Dartmoor Search & Rescue Team Plymouth
 Dartmoor Search & Rescue Team Tavistock
 Devon Cave Rescue
 East Cornwall Search & Rescue Team
 Exmoor Search & Rescue Team
 North Dartmoor Search & Rescue Team
 West Cornwall Search & Rescue Team

Not currently affiliated to a region:
 Avon and Somerset Search & Rescue

Yorkshire Dales
The Yorkshire Dales are covered by the Yorkshire Dales Rescue Panel:
 Cave Rescue Organisation (CRO)
 Scarborough and Ryedale mountain rescue team
 Upper Wharfedale Fell Rescue Association (UWFRA)

See also
Mountain rescue in Wales

Notes

External links

map of MREW locations

Fire and rescue in England
Fire and rescue services of Wales
Volunteer search and rescue in the United Kingdom
Mountain rescue